In probability theory, the Lindley equation, Lindley recursion or Lindley processes is a discrete-time stochastic process An where n takes integer values and:

An + 1 = max(0, An + Bn).

Processes of this form can be used to describe the waiting time of customers in a queue or evolution of a queue length over time. The idea was first proposed in the discussion following Kendall's 1951 paper.

Waiting times
In Dennis Lindley's first paper on the subject the equation is used to describe waiting times experienced by customers in a queue with the First-In First-Out (FIFO) discipline.

Wn + 1 = max(0,Wn + Un)
where
 Tn is the time between the nth and (n+1)th arrivals,
 Sn is the service time of the nth customer, and
 Un = Sn − Tn
 Wn is the waiting time of the nth customer.

The first customer does not need to wait so W1 = 0. Subsequent customers will have to wait if they arrive at a time before the previous customer has been served.

Queue lengths
The evolution of the queue length process can also be written in the form of a Lindley equation.

Integral equation

Lindley's integral equation is a relationship satisfied by the stationary waiting time distribution F(x) in a G/G/1 queue.

Where K(x) is the distribution function of the random variable denoting the difference between the (k - 1)th customer's arrival and the inter-arrival time between (k - 1)th and kth customers. The Wiener–Hopf method can be used to solve this expression.

Notes

Queueing theory